This is a list of members of the Australian Senate from 1944 to 1947. Half of its members were elected at the 21 September 1940 election and had terms starting on 1 July 1941 and finishing on 30 June 1947; the other half were elected at the 21 August 1943 election and had terms starting on 1 July 1944 and finishing on 30 June 1950. The process for filling casual vacancies was complex. While senators were elected for a six-year term, people appointed to a casual vacancy only held office until the earlier of the next election for the House of Representatives or the Senate.

On 21 February 1945, Robert Menzies announced that the parliamentary United Australia Party had been dissolved and replaced by the newly established Liberal Party.

Notes

References

Members of Australian parliaments by term
20th-century Australian politicians
Australian Senate lists